Renuka Mahatme (Kannada: ರೇಣುಕಾ ಮಹಾತ್ಮೆ) is a 1956 Indian Kannada film, directed by Y. R. Swamy and produced by H. M. Reddy. The film stars R. Nagendra Rao, Pandari Bai and Narasimharaju in the lead roles. The film has musical score by H. R. Padmanabha Shashtri.

Cast
R. Nagendra Rao
Pandari Bai
Narasimharaju

References

External links
 

1956 films
1950s Kannada-language films
Films directed by Y. R. Swamy